"Imperial" was the second story arc from Grant Morrison's run on the Marvel Comics title New X-Men, running from issues #118-126. It further explored the origin behind the character Cassandra Nova as well as giving more depth to the student body at the Xavier Institute, specifically the Stepford Cuckoos, Beak, and Angel Salvadore.

Plot

As mutant culture takes center stage in the world media, a new movement propagated by book The Third Species begins to affect human/mutant relations. Several school shootings occur where the assailant takes mutant organs to graft to themselves, believing they will transcend to a higher state of evolution (somehow superior to the natural mutations occurring). Cyclops and Emma investigate the impetus behind this movement by confronting John Sublime, the book's author. He reveals himself to be leader of the U-Men, a radical group that doesn't improve themselves by changing their own genes, but by harvesting mutant parts from unwilling donors. Cyclops and Emma are taken hostage for fatal surgery.

Meanwhile, Wolverine is following a lead on a new mutant, arriving just in time to stop a crew of U-men from killing Angel Salvadore for her insect wings. Despite her reluctance in accepting her mutation, and anyone's help in coming to grips with it, she does follow Wolverine back to the institute, where several squads of U-men are about to assault and slaughter the student body. Jean Grey, with help from her students, fends off the attack, eventually manifesting a phoenix raptor display in psychic dominance. Emma Frost and Cyclops escape from their captors, with Emma confronting John about the damage done to her cosmetically enhanced face, threatening to drop him from the highrise window his office sits in. John forces himself from Emma's grip, seemingly convinced by Martha Johansson, a floating brain in a jar John used to exert psychic control of his captives.

Back at the mansion, Hank McCoy staggers from his ICU bed onto the front lawn. He cradles Cassandra Nova's body in his arms, revealing that Professor Xavier's mind has been switched and he is trapped. Emma and Jean psychically probe Nova's body, discovering that she and Xavier were fraternal twins, but the instant Xavier became aware, he tried to kill his twin in the womb.

In the far reaches of space, the Shi'ar empire is being slowly torn apart by the possessed Charles Xavier. Empress Lilandra sends Smasher through 4-space to warn the Earth of the villainess' coming. Smasher arrives in a field populated by cows, and he loses consciousness before finding someone to spread his message.

The X-Men convene in Cerebra to share what they know about Cassandra Nova. As Jean and Emma's psychic excavation reveals, she is a living entity of pure emotional energy, who used Charles' DNA to form a body. In her mind, the universe and the womb that housed her brother are one and the same. Only she and Charles Xavier are real. Thus, her competition for survival is her twin "brother," and he must be killed. Inside a body booby trapped with numerous degenerative disorders, Xavier telepathically requests a last press conference for the X-Men to communicate his final message to humanity about mutantkind. Cyclops leaves to Xorn, in an attempt to find a way to save Xavier from dying.

During the press conference, Beast discovers that the minor annoyance of a flu epidemic is in fact, a systematic nano-Sentinel attack. This news is overshadowed, however, by the sudden reveal that the Imperial Guard is about to sterilize the entirety of mutantkind, starting with the X-Men. Aboard the Shi'ar Superdestroyer, Cyclops pleads with his and Xorn's captors that the Charles Xavier they are allied with is the very same Cassandra Nova entity they seek to fight, to no avail. At the X-mansion, the Stepford Cuckoos ally with Angel to overthrow the invading Shi'ar, while Jean and Beast shelter the rest of the student body and the visiting media. Beast and Wolverine fend off the assaults of the Guardians, when Smasher is finally found and able to convince Gladiator of the X-Men's innocence. As Cassandra Nova drives Lilandra to command her fleet to die, Cyclops and Xorn fight their way to freedom, saving Lilandra in the process.

Angel and the Cuckoos find Beak, who advises using the Guardian Stuff to free Emma Frost. Xorn heals the X-Men of their sentinel infestations. Afterwards, Jean Grey and Charles Xavier trick Cassandra into using Cerebra for her original goal of erasing mutantkind; however, the moment she uses Cerebra to connect to the worldwide mutant population, she finds one thing in common to all of them: Charles. In the same moment, Jean Grey, who at the moment was becoming increasingly more powerful due to a manifestation of the Phoenix Force, psionically attacks Cassandra and forces her out of the Professor's body. With Charles Xavier's mind restored to his body, Emma Frost uses Stuff's malleable body as a trick to entice Cassandra Nova back into her own body, now a mental prison for her boundless energy. Finally, Charles Xavier is now miraculously able to use his legs.

Major consequences
Introduced the characters Angel Salvadore, John Sublime, the U-Men, and the Stepford Cuckoos.
Xorn joins the X-Men.

Collected editions
The series has been collected into a trade paperback:

Imperial (collects New X-Men #118-126)

As well as:

New X-Men Omnibus (collects New X-Men #114-154 and Annual 2001, 992 pages, December 2006 )
 New X-Men by Grant Morrison Ultimate Collection: Volume 1 (collects New X-Men #114-126, and Annual 2001, 376 pages, May 2008)

References

New X-Men story arcs
Sterilization in fiction